Lochnagar or  is a mountain in the Mounth, in the Grampians of Scotland. It is a popular hill with hillwalkers, and is a noted venue for summer and winter climbing.

Names 

Geography 

Lochnagar is located on the Royal Estate of Balmoral. Its principal feature is a north-facing corrie, around which most of the subsidiary tops, as well as the main peak, sit. The corrie is the location of many classic summer and winter climbing routes. The mountain is a Munro and is popular with hillwalkers at all times of the year, with the most common ascent route being from Glen Muick. Care should be taken on the summit in poor visibility: the plateau has few obvious features and has steep cliffs on its northern edge.

Climate 
Lochnagar's summit experiences an Alpine Tundra Climate, with freezing, snowy winters and cool summers. January has the highest average frosts, despite February nights being colder; January has an average of 26.9 frost days, compared with 24.3 in February. There is the risk of a frost at any time of the year, even in July and August, when each month averages 1 air frost every 10 years.

Nature and conservation
Lochanagar lies within the Cairngorms National Park, and also  gives its name to Deeside and Lochnagar National Scenic Area, one of 40 such areas in Scotland.

The mountain forms part of two designated Special Protection Areas, due to its importance for breeding dotterel (Charadrius morinellus) and golden eagles (Aquila chrysaetos).

Cultural references
Due to its location on the Balmoral estate the mountain has many royal links, and Queen Victoria climbed to the summit in 1848. In the film Mrs. Brown, John Brown and Benjamin Disraeli hike up Lochnagar to discuss the need for the Queen to return to active involvement with government. It is also the setting for a children's story, The Old Man of Lochnagar, originally told by Prince Charles.

The poet Lord Byron spent time in the area in his youth, and wrote the poem, Lachin y Gair (also known as Dark Lochnagar), which also forms the basis of a song which would eventually be composed by Beethoven.

A malt-whisky distillery located near the Balmoral estate on the south side of the River Dee produces the Royal Lochnagar Single Malt whisky.

The hill gives its name to one of the houses at Aboyne Academy.

See also 
 Ben Nevis
 Breast-shaped hill
 List of Munro mountains
 Lochnagar crater: The site of the largest single mine of World War I, exploded at the beginning of the Battle of the Somme. Dug from a communication trench named "Lochnagar Street".
 Mountains and hills of Scotland

References 

Mountains and hills of Aberdeenshire
Munros
Marilyns of Scotland
Mountains and hills of the Eastern Highlands
Special Protection Areas in Scotland
National scenic areas of Scotland
One-thousanders of Scotland